Agrippa Hull (1759–1848) was an African-American patriot who served as an orderly to Tadeusz Kościuszko, a Polish military officer, engineer and nobleman, for five years during the American Revolutionary War. He served for a total of six years and two months. After the war, he received a veteran's pension. It was signed by George Washington, and he treasured it for the rest of his life. Born free in Northampton, Massachusetts, in 1759 in the middle of the Seven Years' War, Hull became the most significant black landowner in Stockbridge, where he lived after the Revolutionary War. He lived to the age of eighty-nine.

Early life, education, military service
At eighteen years old, Hull enlisted in 1777 for six years to fight with the Patriots. For nearly five years, he was a personal aide for Tadeusz Kościuszko, the Polish engineer and nobleman who was essential to Continental defences. He also assisted the medical corps in caring for the sick and wounded. In the last two years, he worked with doctors and was trained to perform simple operations, including amputations of body parts and fixing broken bones.

Impressed with Hull and other African Americans in the Continentals, Kościuszko became a strong supporter of abolitionism. In 1798 Kościuszko named his friend Thomas Jefferson as executor of his will; he intended to use his American estate to purchase freedom for black slaves, including those of Jefferson, and provide them with vocational training and land to be able to provide for themselves and their families. But, after he died in 1817, neither the elderly Jefferson nor another executor carried out his plans. The funds were eventually transferred in 1852 to his heirs in Poland.

Return to Massachusetts
When the war was over, Hull returned to Massachusetts. He used his savings to buy land in Stockbridge, where, over the years, he became one of the largest black landowners in the town. He steadily purchased properties from his savings from work. After the war, he worked for a period as a servant in the household of Theodore Sedgwick. As a young attorney, the latter had defended Elizabeth Freeman (Mum Bett) in her freedom suit and helped gain an end to slavery in Massachusetts.  Freeman worked for the Sedgewick household for years as well. Sedgwick became a state politician and US Senator before being appointed as a justice for the Massachusetts State Supreme Court.

Further reading

 Gary Nash and Graham Russell Hodges, Friends of Liberty: A Tale of Three Patriots, Two Revolutions, and the Betrayal that Divided a Nation: Thomas Jefferson, Thaddeus Kosciuszko, and Agrippa Hull, New York: Basic Books (2008 hardcover)(2012 paperback )

References

External links
Gary B. Nash, "Agrippa Hull" revolutionary patriot", Black Past, 2008
"Agrippa Hull", PBS Africans in America
 

1759 births
1848 deaths
Continental Army soldiers
People of Massachusetts in the American Revolution
People from Northampton, Massachusetts
18th-century American physicians
Black Patriots